Seth Appert (born August 9, 1974) is an American ice hockey coach and former college ice hockey player. Appert was the head coach of the Rensselaer Polytechnic Institute men's ice hockey team. Appert played collegiate hockey at Ferris State. On August 14, 2020, Appert was named Head Coach of the Rochester Americans, the top AHL affiliate of the NHL's Buffalo Sabres.

NCAA Division I ice hockey coaching experience 

In 1999, Appert became an assistant coach at The University of Denver where he worked until the end of the 2005–2006 season.  During that period, Appert helped Denver to capture two NCAA national championships, three WCHA playoff championships, two WCHA regular-season titles, and average 23 wins per season.

On April 19, 2006, Seth Appert was hired as the head ice hockey coach at Rensselaer Polytechnic Institute, replacing Dan Fridgen.  He was fired on March 6, 2017.

Coaching experience with USA Hockey 

Seth Appert was the head coach of Team USA's Under 18 Men's Ice Hockey Team at the Memorial of Ivan Hlinka Tournament that took place August 8–11, 2011, in Breclav, Czech Republic, and Piestany, Slovakia.  Appert had previously served as head coach of Team USA in the Ivan Hlinka Tournament in 2008, and as an assistant coach in 2007.

Leadership of hockey organizations 

On May 1, 2008, Appert was elected President of the American Hockey Coaches Association.  He served as president of this national organization for three years.

Community service awards 

On May 16, 2013, Appert was honored by the Autism Society of the Greater Capital Region of New York for his advocacy and sponsorship of an RPI Engineers Men's Varsity Ice Hockey Game which was designed to be accommodative of people who are on the autistic spectrum.  The game was played on January 18, 2013 versus the Colgate University.  It took place in an atmosphere with fewer flashing lights, loud music, and public address announcements than would be part of a typical game of this nature.

A second annual Autism Awareness Game took place on December 15, 2013, when RPI played the USA Under-18 Men's Ice Hockey Team

Charitable work 

On September 28, 2014, Appert ran the Adirondack Marathon as a fundraising effort for Defending The Blue Line, a U.S. charity that works to ensure that children of military members are afforded every opportunity to participate in the game of ice hockey. Seth ran in memory of Richard Curadi, a soldier with 32 years in the Marines and Army, who died on July 6, 2014.  Richard Curadi was the father of Luke Curadi, a former member of the RPI Men's Varsity Ice Hockey Team.

College Head Coaching Record

References

External links
 

1974 births
Living people
Ferris State Bulldogs men's ice hockey players
RPI Engineers men's ice hockey coaches
People from Cottage Grove, Minnesota
Ice hockey players from Minnesota
American men's ice hockey goaltenders
Sportspeople from the Minneapolis–Saint Paul metropolitan area